Wood is a town in Mellette County, South Dakota, United States. The population was 41 at the 2020 census.

Geography

Wood is located at  (43.498689, -100.480085).

Wood has been assigned the ZIP code 57585 and the FIPS place code 72620.

Climate

Demographics

2010 census
As of the census of 2010, there were 62 people, 29 households, and 15 families residing in the town. The racial makeup of the town was 72.6% White, 8.1% Native American, 3.2% Asian, and 16.1% from two or more races. Hispanic or Latino of any race were 1.6% of the population.

There were 29 households, of which 31.0% had children under the age of 18 living with them, 27.6% were married couples living together, 17.2% had a female householder with no husband present, 6.9% had a male householder with no wife present, and 48.3% were non-families. 44.8% of all households were made up of individuals, and 24.1% had someone living alone who was 65 years of age or older. The average household size was 2.14 and the average family size was 2.93.

The median age in the town was 42.5 years. 25.8% of residents were under the age of 18; 6.4% were between the ages of 18 and 24; 21% were from 25 to 44; 22.5% were from 45 to 64; and 24.2% were 65 years of age or older. The gender makeup of the town was 50.0% male and 50.0% female.

2000 census
As of the census of 2000, there were 66 people, 30 households, and 18 families residing in the town. The population density was 274.6 people per square mile (106.2/km2). There were 38 housing units at an average density of 158.1 per square mile (61.1/km2). The racial makeup of the town was 68.18% White, 28.79% Native American, and 3.03% from two or more races.

There were 30 households, out of which 20.0% had children under the age of 18 living with them, 46.7% were married couples living together, 10.0% had a female householder with no husband present, and 36.7% were non-families. 30.0% of all households were made up of individuals, and 16.7% had someone living alone who was 65 years of age or older. The average household size was 2.20 and the average family size was 2.79.

In the town, the population was spread out, with 21.2% under the age of 18, 1.5% from 18 to 24, 37.9% from 25 to 44, 15.2% from 45 to 64, and 24.2% who were 65 years of age or older. The median age was 39 years. For every 100 females, there were 88.6 males. For every 100 females age 18 and over, there were 92.6 males.

The median income for a household in the town was $27,083, and the median income for a family was $29,375. Males had a median income of $25,313 versus $21,458 for females. The per capita income for the town was $11,070. There were 16.7% of families and 23.9% of the population living below the poverty line, including 23.8% of under eighteens and 50.0% of those over 64.

History
Wood was laid out in 1910 by A. K. Wood, and named for him.

Notable people
 James Abourezk (1931–2023) – First Arab-American to serve in the United States Senate
 Moses Stranger Horse (1890–1941) – Brulé Lakota artist

References

Towns in Mellette County, South Dakota
Towns in South Dakota
Populated places established in 1906
1906 establishments in South Dakota